Trade Nations was a trading simulation social network game developed and published by Z2Live. It is no longer available for download. On September 28, 2016, the servers for the game were deleted, rendering it unplayable.

Development
Trade Nations was Z2Live's first game. It was developed to have integration with JuJuPlay, Z2Live's own iOS based social gaming network, which helped facilitate Trade Nation's growth and retention. Apple later released its own Game Center which replaced JuJuPlay. Through the immediate success of Trade Nations, Z2Live achieved profitability which allowed it to continue to expand and grow.

Gameplay
Trade Nations allowed players to become the mayor of their own village and grow it into a sprawling city. The gameplay centered around collecting raw materials, refining them into precious resources, and creating goods to amass a fortune. Exchanging resources among friends was also highly encouraged and a critical component of the game.

Resources
Throughout the game, the player will collect different types of resources, some worth more than others in the market.
wood
wheat
stone
wool
lumber
cloth
cut stone
Another resource, it can be harvested regularly once the frontier is unlocked, is gold.
Magic Beans are the resource that the player must pay to get.
Z2live points can help buy special buildings and are acquired by completing achievements in all z2live games.

References

2010 video games
Inactive massively multiplayer online games
IOS games
IOS-only games
City-building games
Video games developed in the United States